Park Jong-chan (born 15 January 1970) is a South Korean volleyball player. He competed in the men's tournament at the 1992 Summer Olympics.

References

1970 births
Living people
South Korean men's volleyball players
Olympic volleyball players of South Korea
Volleyball players at the 1992 Summer Olympics
Place of birth missing (living people)
Asian Games medalists in volleyball
Asian Games bronze medalists for South Korea
Volleyball players at the 1994 Asian Games
Medalists at the 1994 Asian Games
20th-century South Korean people